Carodista flavicana is a moth in the family Lecithoceridae. It was described by Chun-Sheng Wu in 2003. It is found in Guizhou, China.

References

Moths described in 2003
Carodista